Melese drucei is a moth of the family Erebidae first described by Walter Rothschild in 1909. It is found in Suriname, Peru, Brazil, Guyana. and French Guiana.

References

Moths described in 1909
Melese